The Blind Man is a 1910 painting by the Flemish artist Gustave Van de Woestyne, now in the Royal Museum for Fine Arts, Antwerp. It is one of a series of portraits of farm workers he produced in Leuven and shows the influence of what were then called the 'Flemish Primitives', such as Rogier van der Weyden's Portrait of Philip van Croy.

Sources 

20th-century portraits
Portraits of men
Paintings in the collection of the Royal Museum of Fine Arts Antwerp
Paintings by Gustave Van de Woestijne
1910 paintings